The 2012 Cleveland Indians season was the 112th season for the franchise.  The team attempted (but failed) to improve on its 2011 campaign in which was 80-82 and finished 2nd in the American League Central division.  The team was also looking to return to the playoffs for the first time since 2007. The team played all of its home games at Progressive Field, which will be in its 19th season.

The Indians were in playoff contention for much of the first four months of the season.  The team had a record of 44-41 at the All Star Break, and were just a few games back in both the AL Central and Wild Card races.  However, the team struggled through the second half, going just 24-53 after the break, for a final record of 68-94, placing 4th in the division.

This marked the third and final season under the leadership of manager Manny Acta.  Acta was fired on September 27 with six games remaining.  Bench coach and former Indians' catcher Sandy Alomar Jr. was named the interim manager for the team's final six games.

Spring training
The Indians had a 7–22 win–loss record in spring training, their .241 winning percentage being the worst among all MLB teams during pre-season. Three of their games finished tied and were therefore not included in the standings.

Regular season

Opening Day lineup

 Michael Brantley – CF
 Asdrúbal Cabrera – SS
 Shin-Soo Choo – RF
 Carlos Santana – C
 Travis Hafner – DH
 Shelley Duncan – LF
 Casey Kotchman – 1B
 Jason Kipnis – 2B
 Jack Hannahan – 3B

 Justin Masterson – SP

April

For the fourth straight season, the Indians would lose the season opener, in record fashion. The Indians played host to the Toronto Blue Jays and had a 4–1 lead before allowing the Blue Jays to even the score in the ninth inning. The game would last 16 innings before the Indians fell 7–4 in what would be the longest season-opener in Major League history, besting the previous record of 15 innings (done in 1926 and 1960). The next day when the clubs had finished their second meeting, a 7–4 win for Toronto in 12 innings, it was the first time since 1969 that two games to open the season had gone 12 innings or more.

On the road against Seattle, the Indians had their largest comeback win since May 25, 2009 when they rallied from a 7-run deficit before eventually winning 11–10. The Indians won two of three against the Oakland Athletics and thus for the first time since the 1988 won their first three road series on the year.

After a 13–7 win over the Kansas City Royals, the Indians had for the first time in the club's 111-year history scored at least 8 runs in their first 3 road games of the season. The team failed to hit a home run in 11 straight games to end April, the franchise's longest homer-less streak since the 1983 season when they went 14 games.

The Indians would go 11–9 in the month, finishing with a  game lead over the Detroit Tigers in the AL Central. The team was 7–2 on the road.

May

The Indians started May with a stretch of 21 games in 20 days.  The Indians went 13-8 in this stretch. The Tribe started the month on the road and when they won the third game of a three-game series with the Chicago White Sox, it was their fourth road series win in a row to start the season, which was last done by the 1961 Indians (although the 1961 club opened the season with a one-game "series" at Detroit).  They would lose their next road series to stop the streak, losing to the Boston Red Sox in three of four games. The club would have their first day off of the month on the 21st, and continued their good play with a home sweep over Detroit that would give the Indians a 3-game lead over second place Chicago and a 6-game lead over Detroit.  However, this lead was short-lived as the Indians were immediately swept by Chicago in a three-game road series en route to ending May with losses in five of their last six games.  Injuries contributed to this poor performance, as shortstop Asdrúbal Cabrera (hamstring), designated hitter Travis Hafner (knee), and catcher Carlos Santana (concussion) all suffered injuries late in the month. Despite being in first place during most of May, the attendance at Progressive Field was last in the majors.

June 
The team started June at a 6-9 clip. The poor start was highlighted by a sweep at the hands of the Cincinnati Reds in Cincinnati June 12–14. However, the Tribe would return the favor and sweep their in-state rivals at home, earning a split in the year's Ohio Cup. The rest of interleague play did not fare well as the Indians went 8-10 against the Senior Circuit. Near the end of the month, the Indians lost five straight games including being swept by the New York Yankees. The Indians ended the month recording a season-high 19 hits in an 11-5 road win over the Baltimore Orioles to keep them from going below the .500 mark. The Indians went 12-15 in June and entered July with an overall record of 39-38, good for second in the Central, 2 games behind Chicago. Asdrúbal Cabrera led the team with 6 HR and 18 RBI in the month, while right fielder Shin-Soo Choo recorded a team-high 34 hits. Also during the month, center fielder Michael Brantley had a 22-game hitting streak, the longest in the MLB to that point in the season.

July 
Shortstop Asdrúbal Cabrera and closer Chris Perez were named to the American League All Star Team on July 1.  Cabrera participated in the game as a reserve infielder.  Perez did not pitch in the game.

The Indians as a team struggled offensively for much of July, as the team scored three or fewer runs eight times in the first 13 games of the month.  Cabrera and catcher Carlos Santana had the greatest slumps.  Between July 1 and 22, Cabrera's average fell 28 points, from .300 to .272.  Between May 15 and July 17, Santana was hitting .168 with no home runs.  After a July 17 loss to the Tampa Bay Rays, the team batting average with the bases loaded fell to .193, the third lowest in the AL. Second basemen Jason Kipnis, who had 46 RBIs heading into July, recorded 9 for the entire month while designated hitter Travis Hafner had 6.

However, the Indians' pitching staff, specifically the back end of the bullpen kept them in most games.  The club has been able to rely on Perez and set-up man Vinnie Pestano to hold the lead in close games.  To the July 17-point in the season, Cleveland held a 27-3 record in games which both Perez and Pestano saw action. The Indians' woes continued in the latter half of the month, however, and ended July on a four-game losing streak, including losses to the Twins and Royals, both below them in the Central standings. The Indians' record fell three games under .500 for the first time since April 11. Starting pitcher Josh Tomlin, who went 2-5 with a 7.02 ERA in his last eight outings, was moved to the bullpen at the end of the month to take on relief pitching duties.

August 
The Indians ended a nine-game road trip with a loss on August 5, failing to win during a road trip of 9 games or more for the first time in franchise history. The losing streak continued for two more home games and ended with a 6-2 win over the Minnesota Twins on August 8.  The 11 straight losses was one short of a franchise record. After the Indians lost a ninth-straight game on August 24, it marked the first time in franchise history two losing streaks of nine games or more had occurred within the same season. Following a 5-3 loss to the Texas Rangers on August 31, the Indians finished the month at 5-24, tying a franchise record for the most losses in a month, originally set in July 1914.

September/October 
After a disastrous August, the Indians had a decent start to September, beginning the month 3-2 against eventual playoff teams Texas and Detroit.  The Indians' struggles would continue, however. On September 27 the team fired manager Manny Acta and promoted bench coach Sandy Alomar Jr. to interim manager for the team's final six games.  Alomar, who was in contention for the Indians' managerial job in 2013, but lost the job to Terry Francona, led the Indians to a 3-3 record in these games.

The Indians wrapped up the season on October 3 with a shutout 9-0 loss at the hands of the visiting Chicago White Sox. The Indians finished 68-94, which was 4th place in the American League Central Division.

Season standings

American League Central

American League Wild Card

Game log 

|-  style="text-align:center; background:#fbb;"
| 1 || April 5 || Blue Jays || 7–4 (16) || Pérez (1–0) || Asencio (0–1) || || 43,190 || 0–1
|-  style="text-align:center; background:#fbb;"
| 2 || April 7 || Blue Jays || 7–4 (12) || Janssen (1–0) || Sipp (0–1) || || 18,842 || 0–2
|-  style="text-align:center; background:#bfb;"
| 3 || April 8 || Blue Jays || 4–3 || Lowe (1–0) || Carreño (0–1) || C. Perez (1) || 10,518 || 1–2
|-  style="text-align:center; background:#fbb;"
| 4 || April 9 || White Sox || 4–2 || Sale (1–0) || Tomlin (0–1) || Santiago (2) || 9,473 || 1–3
|-  style="text-align:center; background:#bbb;"
| -- || April 10 || White Sox || colspan=6 | Postponed (rain); rescheduled May 7 (game 1)
|-  style="text-align:center; background:#fbb;"
| 5 || April 11 || White Sox || 10–6 || Danks (1–1) || Masterson (0–1) || || 9,072 || 1–4
|-  style="text-align:center; background:#bfb;"
| 6 || April 13 || @ Royals || 8–3 || Lowe (2–0) || Hochevar (1–1) || || 40,230 || 2–4
|-  style="text-align:center; background:#bfb;"
| 7 || April 14 || @ Royals || 11–9 (10) || Asencio (1–1) || Holland (0–1) || C. Perez (2) || 21,788 || 3–4
|-  style="text-align:center; background:#bfb;"
| 8 || April 15 || @ Royals || 13–7 || Jiménez (1–0) || Mendoza (0–2) || || 21,182 || 4–4
|-  style="text-align:center; background:#bfb;"
| 9 || April 17 || @ Mariners || 9–8 || R. Pérez (1–0) || Furbush (0–1) || C. Perez (3) || 12,461 || 5–4
|-  style="text-align:center; background:#fbb;"
| 10 || April 18 || @ Mariners || 4–1 || Vargas (2–1) || Lowe (2–1) || League (5) || 11,343 || 5–5
|-  style="text-align:center; background:#bfb;"
| 11 || April 19 || @ Mariners || 2–1 || Tomlin (1–1) || League (0–1) || C. Perez (4) || 12,942 || 6–5
|-  style="text-align:center; background:#bfb;"
| 12 || April 20 || @ Athletics || 4–3 || Jiménez (2–0) || Godfrey (0–3) || C. Perez (5) || 14,340 || 7–5
|-  style="text-align:center; background:#bfb;"
| 13 || April 21 || @ Athletics || 5–1 || Gómez (1–0) || McCarthy (0–3) || C. Perez (6) || 25,258 || 8–5
|-  style="text-align:center; background:#fbb;"
| 14 || April 22 || @ Athletics || 5–1 || Ross (1–0) || Masterson (0–2) || || 24,049 || 8–6
|-  style="text-align:center; background:#bfb;"
| 15 || April 24 || Royals || 4–3 || Lowe (3-1) || Sánchez (1-1) || C. Perez (7) || 9,137 || 9–6
|-  style="text-align:center; background:#fbb;"
| 16 || April 25 || Royals || 8–2 || Hochevar (2–1) || Jiménez (2–1) || || 10,552 || 9–7
|-  style="text-align:center; background:#fbb;"
| 17 || April 26 || Royals || 4–2 || Mendoza (1–2) || Tomlin (1–2) || Broxton (2) || 9,229 || 9–8
|-  style="text-align:center; background:#bfb;"
| 18 || April 27 || Angels || 3–2 ||Pestano (1–0) ||Carpenter (0–1) || || 12,597 || 10–8 
|-  style="text-align:center; background:#fbb;"
| 19 || April 28 || Angels || 2–1 || Haren (1–1) || Gómez (1–1) || Downs (1) || 11,316 || 10–9
|-  style="text-align:center; background:#bfb;"
| 20 || April 29 || Angels || 4–0 || Lowe (4–1) || Santana (0–5) || || 15,421 || 11–9
|-

|-  style="text-align:center; background:#fbb;"
| 21 || May 1 || @ White Sox || 7–2 || Sale (3–1) || Jiménez (2–2) || || 15,212 || 11–10
|-  style="text-align:center; background:#bfb;"
| 22 || May 2 || @ White Sox || 6–3 || Smith (1–0) || Ohman (0–1) || C. Perez (8) || 15,192 || 12–10
|-  style="text-align:center; background:#bfb;"
| 23 || May 3 || @ White Sox || 7–5 || Masterson (1–2) ||Danks (2–4)|| C. Perez (9) || 17,314 || 13–10
|-  style="text-align:center; background:#bfb;"
| 24 || May 4 || Rangers || 6–3 || Gómez (2–1) ||Lewis (3–1) || C. Perez (10) || 16,147 || 14–10 
|-  style="text-align:center; background:#fbb;"
| 25 || May 5 || Rangers || 5–2 (11) || Ogando (1–0) || Smith (1–1) || Nathan (7) || 21,307 || 14–11
|-  style="text-align:center; background:#bfb;"
| 26 || May 6 || Rangers || 4–2 || Jiménez (3–2) || Darvish (4–1) || C. Perez (11) || 18,171 || 15–11
|-  style="text-align:center; background:#bfb;"
| 27 || May 7 || White Sox || 8–6 || McAllister (1–0) || Humber (1–2) || Hagadone (1) || 9,196 || 16–11 
|-  style="text-align:center; background:#bfb;"
| 28 || May 7 || White Sox || 3–2 || Smith (2–1) || Thornton (1–2) || Sipp (1) || 10,483 || 17–11
|-  style="text-align:center; background:#fbb;"
| 29 || May 8 || White Sox || 5–3 (10) || Santiago (1–1) || C. Perez (0–1) || Reed (2) || 11,304 || 17–12
|-  style="text-align:center; background:#fbb;"
| 30 || May 9 || White Sox || 8–1 || Peavy (4–1) || Gómez (2–2) || || 11,285 || 17–13
|-  style="text-align:center; background:#bfb;"
| 31 || May 10 || @ Red Sox || 8–3 || Lowe (5–1) || Beckett (2–4) || || 37,348 || 18–13
|-  style="text-align:center; background:#fbb;"
| 32 || May 11 || @ Red Sox || 7–5 || Buchholz (4–1) || Jiménez (3–3) || Aceves (6) || 37,438 || 18–14
|-  style="text-align:center; background:#fbb;"
| 33 || May 12 || @ Red Sox || 4–1 || Doubront (3–1) || McAllister (1–1) || Aceves (7) || 38,048 || 18–15
|-  style="text-align:center; background:#fbb;"
| 34 || May 13 || @ Red Sox || 12–1 || Bard (3–4) || Masterson (1–3) || || 37,611 || 18–16
|-  style="text-align:center; background:#bfb;"
| 35 || May 14 || @ Twins || 5–4 || Smith (3–1) || Capps (0–2) || C. Perez (12) || 32,313 || 19–16
|-  style="text-align:center; background:#bfb;"
| 36 || May 15 || @ Twins || 5–0 || Lowe (6–1) || Marquis (2–3) || || 35,732 || 20–16
|-  style="text-align:center; background:#bfb;"
| 37 || May 16 || Mariners || 9–3 || Jiménez (4–3) || Hernández (3–3) || || 12,092 || 21–16
|-  style="text-align:center; background:#bfb;"
| 38 || May 17 || Mariners || 6–5 (11) || Smith (4–1) || League (0–3) || || 12,894 || 22–16
|-  style="text-align:center; background:#fbb;"
| 39 || May 18 || Marlins || 3–2 || Zambrano (2–2) || Sipp (0–2) || Bell (4) || 29,378 || 22–17
|-  style="text-align:center; background:#bfb;"
| 40 || May 19 || Marlins || 2–0 || Gómez (3–2) || Sánchez (2–2) || C. Perez (13) || 29,799 || 23–17
|-  style="text-align:center; background:#fbb;"
| 41 || May 20 || Marlins || 5–3 || Johnson (2–3) || Lowe (6–2) || Bell (5) || 23,668 || 23–18
|-  style="text-align:center; background:#bfb;"
| 42 || May 22 || Tigers || 5–3 || Jiménez (5–3) || Porcello (3–4) || C. Perez (14) || 15,049 || 24–18
|-  style="text-align:center; background:#bfb;"
| 43 || May 23 || Tigers || 4–2 || Pestano (2–0) || Coke (1–1) || C. Perez (15) || 22,000 || 25–18
|-  style="text-align:center; background:#bfb;"
| 44 || May 24 || Tigers || 2–1 || Masterson (2–3) || Verlander (5–2) || C. Perez (16) || 23,622 || 26–18
|-  style="text-align:center; background:#fbb;"
| 45 || May 25 || @ White Sox || 9–3 || Quintana (1–0) || Gómez (3–3) || || 21,371 || 26–19
|-  style="text-align:center; background:#fbb;"
| 46 || May 26 || @ White Sox || 14–7 || Peavy (6–1) || Lowe (6–3) || || 27,151 || 26–20
|-  style="text-align:center; background:#fbb;"
| 47 || May 27 || @ White Sox || 12–6 || Floyd (4–5) || Jiménez (5–4) || || 22,182 || 26–21
|-  style="text-align:center; background:#bfb;"
| 48 || May 28 || Royals || 8–5 || Tomlin (2–2) || Adcock (0–3) || C. Perez (17) || 25,377 || 27–21
|-  style="text-align:center; background:#fbb;"
| 49 || May 29 || Royals || 8–2 || Smith (1–1) || Masterson (2–4) || || 14,253 || 27–22
|-  style="text-align:center; background:#fbb;"
| 50 || May 30 || Royals || 6–3 || Chen (4–5) || Gómez (3–4) || Broxton (11) || 17,112 || 27–23
|-

|-  style="text-align:center; background:#bfb;"
| 51 || June 1 || Twins || 7–1 || Lowe (7–3) || Pavano (2–5) || || 19,904 || 28–23
|-  style="text-align:center; background:#fbb;"
| 52 || June 2 || Twins || 7–4 || Duensing (1–2) || Tomlin (2–3) || Capps (11) || 25,469 || 28–24
|-  style="text-align:center; background:#fbb;"
| 53 || June 3 || Twins || 6–3 || Diamond (4–1) || Masterson (2–5) || Capps (12) || 21,238 || 28–25
|-  style="text-align:center; background:#bfb;"
| 54 || June 5 || @ Tigers || 4–2 || Jiménez (6–4) || Smyly (2–2) || C. Perez (18) || 33,258 || 29–25
|-  style="text-align:center; background:#bfb;"
| 55 || June 6 || @ Tigers || 9–6 || Gómez (4–4) || Scherzer (5–4) || C. Perez (19) || 31,350 || 30–25
|-  style="text-align:center; background:#fbb;"
| 56 || June 7 || @ Tigers || 7–5 || Crosby (1–1) || Lowe (7–4) || Valverde (10) || 40,851 || 30–26
|-  style="text-align:center; background:#bfb;"
| 57 || June 8 || @ Cardinals || 6–2 || Tomlin (3–3) || Westbrook (4–6) || || 42,098 || 31–26
|-  style="text-align:center; background:#fbb;"
| 58 || June 9 || @ Cardinals || 2–0 || Lohse (6–1) || Masterson (2–6) || Motte (11) || 41,694 || 31–27
|-  style="text-align:center; background:#bfb;"
| 59 || June 10 || @ Cardinals || 4–1 || Pestano (3–0) || Motte (3–3) || C. Perez (20) || 43,400 || 32–27
|-  style="text-align:center; background:#fbb;"
| 60 || June 12 || @ Reds || 7–1 || Cueto (7–3) || Gómez (4–5) || || 24,758 || 32–28
|-  style="text-align:center; background:#fbb;"
| 61 || June 13 || @ Reds || 5–3 || Latos (5–2) || Lowe (7–5) || Chapman (7) || 27,428 || 32–29
|-  style="text-align:center; background:#fbb;"
| 62 || June 14 || @ Reds || 12–5 || Arredondo (4–1) || Tomlin (3–4) || || 34,193 || 32–30
|-  style="text-align:center; background:#bfb;"
| 63 || June 15 || Pirates || 2–0 || Masterson (3–6) || McDonald (5–3) || C. Perez (21) || 31,920 || 33–30
|-  style="text-align:center; background:#fbb;"
| 64 || June 16 || Pirates || 9–2 || Burnett (7–2) || Jiménez (6–5) || || 30,408 || 33–31
|-  style="text-align:center; background:#fbb;"
| 65 || June 17 || Pirates || 9–5 || Watson (4–0) || Gómez (4–6) || || 27,388 || 33–32
|-  style="text-align:center; background:#bfb;"
| 66 || June 18 || Reds || 10–9 || Smith (5–1) || LeCure (2–2) || C. Perez (22) || 19,948 || 34–32
|-  style="text-align:center; background:#bfb;"
| 67 || June 19 || Reds || 3–2 (10) || Hagadone (1–0) || Chapman (4–3) || || 17,213 || 35–32
|-  style="text-align:center; background:#bfb;"
| 68 || June 20 || Reds || 8–1 || Masterson (4–6) || Arroyo (3–5) || || 23,544 || 36–32
|-  style="text-align:center; background:#bfb;"
| 69 || June 22 || @ Astros || 2–0 || Jiménez (7–5) || Harrell (6–6) || C. Perez (23) || 26,932 || 37–32
|-  style="text-align:center; background:#fbb;"
| 70 || June 23 || @ Astros || 8–1 || Keuchel (1–0) || Gómez (4–7) || || 34,241 || 37–33
|-  style="text-align:center; background:#fbb;"
| 71 || June 24 || @ Astros || 7–1 || Happ (6–7) || Lowe (7–6) || || 21,191 || 37–34
|-  style="text-align:center; background:#fbb;"
| 72 || June 25 || @ Yankees || 7–1 || Kuroda (7–7) || Tomlin (3–5) || || 42,290 || 37–35
|-  style="text-align:center; background:#fbb;"
| 73 || June 26 || @ Yankees || 6–4 || Hughes (8–6) || Masterson (4–7) || Soriano (16) || 43,006 || 37–36
|-  style="text-align:center; background:#fbb;"
| 74 || June 27 || @ Yankees || 5–4 || García (2–2) || Jiménez (7–6) || Soriano (17) || 45,099 || 37–37
|-  style="text-align:center; background:#bfb;"
| 75 || June 28 || @ Orioles || 7–2 || McAllister (2–1) || Chen (7–4) || || 17,676 || 38–37
|-  style="text-align:center; background:#fbb;"
| 76 || June 29 || @ Orioles || 9–8 || Lindstrom (1–0) || Smith (5–2) || Johnson (23) || 24,779 || 38–38
|-  style="text-align:center; background:#bfb;"
| 77 || June 30 || @ Orioles || 11–5 || Tomlin (4–5) || Eveland (0–1) || || 35,335 || 39–38
|-

|-  style="text-align:center; background:#bfb;"
| 78 || July 1 || @ Orioles || 6–2 || Masterson (5–7) || Matusz (5–10) || || 16,689 || 40–38
|-  style="text-align:center; background:#fbb;"
| 79 || July 2 || Angels || 3–0 || Weaver (9–1) || Jiménez (7–7) || Downs (7) || 21,616 || 40–39
|-  style="text-align:center; background:#bfb;"
| 80 || July 3 || Angels || 9–5 || McAllister (3–1) || Haren (6–8) || || 29,292 || 41–39
|-  style="text-align:center; background:#bfb;"
| 81 || July 4 || Angels || 12–3 || Lowe (8–6) || Santana (4–9) || || 20,979 || 42–39
|-  style="text-align:center; background:#bfb;"
| 82 || July 5 || Rays || 3–1 || Tomlin (5–5) || Hellickson (4–5) || C. Perez (24) || 26,577 || 43–39
|-  style="text-align:center; background:#fbb;"
| 83 || July 6 || Rays || 10–3 || Cobb (4–5) || Masterson (5–8) || || 28,734 || 43–40
|-  style="text-align:center; background:#bfb;"
| 84 || July 7 || Rays || 7–3 || Jiménez (8–7) || Moore (5–6) || || 20,658 || 44–40
|-  style="text-align:center; background:#fbb;"
| 85 || July 8 || Rays || 7–6 || Peralta (1–3) || C. Perez (0–2) || Rodney (25) || 19,163 || 44–41
|-  style="text-align:center; background:#bfb;"
| 86 || July 13 || @ Blue Jays || 1–0 || Masterson (6–8) || Romero (8–5) || C. Perez (25) || 32,308 || 45–41
|-  style="text-align:center; background:#fbb;"
| 87 || July 14 || @ Blue Jays || 11–9 || Laffey (1–1) || Jiménez (8–8) || Janssen (13) || 32,517 || 45–42
|-  style="text-align:center; background:#fbb;"
| 88 || July 15 || @ Blue Jays || 3–0 || Villanueva (4–0) || Lowe (8–7) || Oliver (1) || 26,407 || 45–43
|-  style="text-align:center; background:#bfb;"
| 89 || July 16 || @ Rays || 3–2 || McAllister (4–1) || Cobb (4–6) || C. Perez (26) || 14,337 || 46–43
|-  style="text-align:center; background:#fbb;"
| 90 || July 17 || @ Rays || 4–2 || Moore (6–6) || Tomlin (5–6) || Rodney (27) || 15,712 || 46–44
|-  style="text-align:center; background:#bfb;"
| 91 || July 18 || @ Rays || 10–6 || Rogers (1–2) || Farnsworth (0–2) || || 15,143 || 47–44
|-  style="text-align:center; background:#fbb;"
| 92 || July 19 || @ Rays || 6–0 || Price (13–4) || Jiménez (8–9) || || 27,856 || 47–45
|-  style="text-align:center; background:#fbb;"
| 93 || July 20 || Orioles || 10–2 || González (2–1) || Lowe (8–8) || || 33,954 || 47–46
|-  style="text-align:center; background:#fbb;"
| 94 || July 21 || Orioles || 3–1 || Tillman (2–1) || McAllister (4–2) || Johnson (29) || 36,247 || 47–47
|-  style="text-align:center; background:#fbb;"
| 95 || July 22 || Orioles || 4–3 || Britton (1–0) || Tomlin (5–7) || Johnson (30) || 28,049 || 47–48
|-  style="text-align:center; background:#bfb;"
| 96 || July 23 || Orioles || 3–1 || Masterson (7–8) || Hunter (4–5) || C. Perez (27) || 18,264 || 48–48
|-  style="text-align:center; background:#bfb;"
| 97 || July 24 || Tigers || 3–2 || Smith (6–2) || Fister (4–7) || C. Perez (28) || 23,637 || 49–48
|-  style="text-align:center; background:#fbb;"
| 98 || July 25 || Tigers || 5–3 || Scherzer (10–5) || Lowe (8–9) || Valverde (19) || 24,029 || 49–49
|-  style="text-align:center; background:#bfb;"
| 99 || July 26 || Tigers || 5–3 || Smith (7–2) || Verlander (11–6) || C. Perez (29) || 34,579 || 50–49
|-  style="text-align:center; background:#fbb;"
| 100 || July 27 || @ Twins || 11–0 || Diamond (9–4) || Tomlin (5–8) || || 37,820 || 50–50
|-  style="text-align:center; background:#fbb;"
| 101 || July 28 || @ Twins || 12–5 || Deduno (2–0) || Masterson (7–9) || || 39,166 || 50–51
|-  style="text-align:center; background:#fbb;"
| 102 || July 29 || @ Twins || 5–1 || Duensing (2–6) || Jiménez (8–10) || || 34,720 || 50–52
|-  style="text-align:center; background:#fbb;"
| 103 || July 31 || @ Royals || 8–3 || Hochevar (7–9) || Lowe (8–10) || || 18,569 || 50–53
|-

|-  style="text-align:center; background:#fbb;"
| 104 || August 1 || @ Royals || 5–2 || Mendoza (5–7) || McAllister (4–3) || Holland (1) || 17,033 || 50–54
|-  style="text-align:center; background:#fbb;"
| 105 || August 2 || @ Royals || 7–6 (11) || Crow (2–1) || Rogers (1–3) || || 15,135 || 50–55
|-  style="text-align:center; background:#fbb;"
|106 || August 3 || @ Tigers || 10–2 || Sánchez (6–8) || Masterson (7–10) || || 41,502 || 50–56
|-  style="text-align:center; background:#fbb;"
| 107 || August 4 || @ Tigers || 6–1 || Fister (6–7) || Jiménez (8–11) || || 42,744 || 50–57
|-  style="text-align:center; background:#fbb;"
| 108 || August 5 || @ Tigers || 10–8 (10) || Downs (1–0) || C. Perez (0–3) || || 38,007 || 50–58
|-  style="text-align:center; background:#fbb;"
| 109 || August 6 || Twins || 14–3 || Diamond (10–5) || McAllister (4–4) || || 18,775 || 50–59
|-  style="text-align:center; background:#fbb;"
| 110 || August 7 || Twins || 7–5 || Robertson (1–0) || C. Perez (0–4) || Perkins (7) || 14,813 || 50–60
|-  style="text-align:center; background:#bfb;"
| 111 || August 8 || Twins || 6–2 || Masterson (8–10) || Duensing (2–7) || || 18,805 || 51–60
|-  style="text-align:center; background:#bfb;"
| 112 || August 9 || Red Sox || 5–3 || Jiménez (9–11) || Doubront (10–6) || C. Perez (30) || 19,639 || 52–60
|-  style="text-align:center; background:#fbb;"
| 113 || August 10 || Red Sox || 3–2 || Buchholz (10–3) || Seddon (0–1) || || 27,246 || 52–61
|-  style="text-align:center; background:#bfb;"
| 114 || August 11 || Red Sox || 5–2 || McAllister (5–4) || Morales (3–3) || C. Perez (31) || 27,894 || 53–61
|-  style="text-align:center; background:#fbb;"
| 115 || August 12 || Red Sox || 14–1 || Lester (6–10) || Kluber (0–1) || || 27,488 || 53–62
|-  style="text-align:center; background:#bfb;"
| 116 || August 13 || @ Angels || 6–2 || Masterson (9–10) || Wilson (9–9) || C. Perez (32) || 36,620 || 54–62
|-  style="text-align:center; background:#fbb;"
| 117 || August 14 || @ Angels || 9–6 || Greinke (10–4) || Jiménez (9–12) || Frieri (14) || 39,827 || 54–63
|-  style="text-align:center; background:#fbb;"
| 118 || August 15 || @ Angels || 8–4 || Santana (6–10) || Hernández (0–1) || || 37,554 || 54–64
|-  style="text-align:center; background:#fbb;"
| 119 || August 17 || @ Athletics || 6–4 || Norberto (4–1) || Smith (7–3) || Balfour (10) || 13,967 || 54–65
|-  style="text-align:center; background:#fbb;"
| 120 || August 18 || @ Athletics || 8–5 || Colón (10–9) || Kluber (0–2) || Balfour (11) || 30,132 || 54–66
|-  style="text-align:center; background:#fbb;"
| 121 || August 19 || @ Athletics || 7–0 || Parker (8–7) || Masterson (9–11) || || 20,130 || 54–67
|-  style="text-align:center; background:#fbb;"
| 122 || August 20 || @ Mariners || 5–3 || Furbush (5–2) || Smith (7–4) || Wilhelmsen (18) || 14,687 || 54–68
|-  style="text-align:center; background:#fbb;"
| 123 || August 21 || @ Mariners || 5–1 || Hernández (12–5) || Hernández (0–2) || Luetge (2) || 39,204 || 54–69
|-  style="text-align:center; background:#fbb;"
| 124 || August 22 || @ Mariners || 3–1 || Pryor (3–0) || Pestano (3–1) || Wilhelmsen (19) || 18,578 || 54–70
|-  style="text-align:center; background:#fbb;"
| 125 || August 24 || Yankees || 3–1 || Sabathia (13–3) || Allen (0–1) || Soriano (32) || 27,986 || 54–71
|-  style="text-align:center; background:#bfb;"
| 126 || August 25 || Yankees || 3–1 || Masterson (10–11) || Kuroda (12–9) || C. Perez (33) || 34,374 || 55–71
|-  style="text-align:center; background:#fbb;"
| 127 || August 26 || Yankees || 4–2 || Logan (5–2) || Jiménez (9–13) || Soriano (33) || 26,166 || 55–72
|-  style="text-align:center; background:#fbb;"
| 128 || August 27 || Athletics || 3–0 || Anderson (2–0) || Hernández (0–3) || Balfour (15) || 13,018 || 55–73
|-  style="text-align:center; background:#fbb;"
| 129 || August 28 || Athletics || 7–0 || Milone (11–9) || McAllister (5–5) || || 13,413 || 55–74
|-  style="text-align:center; background:#fbb;"
| 130 || August 29 || Athletics || 8–4 || Blackley (5–3) || Kluber (0–3) || Cook (13) || 14,412 || 55–75
|-  style="text-align:center; background:#fbb;"
| 131 || August 30 || Athletics || 12–7 || Parker (9–7) || Masterson (10–12) || || 14,500 || 55–76
|-  style="text-align:center; background:#fbb;"
| 132 || August 31 || Rangers || 5–3 || Dempster (9–6) || Jiménez (9–14) || Nathan (28) || 16,700 || 55–77
|-

|-  style="text-align:center; background:#bfb;"
| 133 || September 1 || Rangers || 4–3 || Gómez (5–7) || Feldman (6–11) || Pestano (1) || 17,218 || 56–77
|-  style="text-align:center; background:#fbb;"
| 134 || September 2 || Rangers || 8–3 || Holland (10–6) || McAllister (5–6) || || 19,474 || 56–78
|-  style="text-align:center; background:#bfb;"
| 135 || September 3 || @ Tigers || 3–2 || Kluber (1–3) || Downs (1–1) || Pestano (2) || 35,418 || 57–78
|-  style="text-align:center; background:#bfb;"
| 136 || September 4 || @ Tigers || 3–2 || Masterson (11–12) || Porcello (9–11) || C. Perez (34) || 27,729 || 58–78
|-  style="text-align:center; background:#fbb;"
| 137 || September 5 || @ Tigers || 7–1 || Fister (8–8) || Jiménez (9–15) || || 28,881 || 58–79
|-  style="text-align:center; background:#bfb;"
| 138 || September 7 || @ Twins || 7–6 || Huff (1–0) || Robertson (1–2) || C. Perez (35) || 30,111 || 59–79
|-  style="text-align:center; background:#fbb;"
| 139 || September 8 || @ Twins || 3–0 || De Vries (5–5) || McAllister (5–7) || Perkins (11) || 33,698 || 59–80
|-  style="text-align:center; background:#fbb;"
| 140 || September 9 || @ Twins || 8–7 || Duensing (4–10) || Pestano (3–2) || || 30,219 || 59–81
|-  style="text-align:center; background:#fbb;"
| 141 || September 10 || @ Twins || 7–2 || Deduno (6–3) || Masterson (11–13) || || 27,526 || 59–82
|-  style="text-align:center; background:#fbb;"
| 142 || September 11 || @ Rangers || 6–4 || Harrison (16–9) || Jiménez (9–16) || Nathan (32) || 34,765 || 59–83
|-  style="text-align:center; background:#fbb;"
| 143 || September 12 || @ Rangers || 5–2 || Dempster (11–6) || Gómez (5–8) || Nathan (33) || 36,001 || 59–84
|-  style="text-align:center; background:#bfb;"
| 144 || September 13 || @ Rangers || 5–4 || Maine (1-0) || Nathan (2–4) || C. Perez (36) || 36,102 || 60–84
|-  style="text-align:center; background:#fbb;"
| 145 || September 14 || Tigers || 4–0 || Verlander (14–8) || Kluber (1–4) || || 17,185 || 60–85
|-  style="text-align:center; background:#fbb;"
| 146 || September 15 || Tigers || 5–3 || Sánchez (8–12) || Masterson (11–14) || Valverde (31) || 22,849 || 60–86
|-  style="text-align:center; background:#bfb;"
| 147 || September 16 || Tigers || 7–6 || Rogers (2–1) || Valverde (3–3) || || 17,233 || 61–86
|-  style="text-align:center; background:#fbb;"
| 148 || September 18 || Twins || 6–5 (12) || Robertson (2–2) || Maine (2–2) || Perkins (12) || 10,342 || 61–87
|-  style="text-align:center; background:#fbb;"
| 149 || September 19 || Twins || 6–4 || Hendriks (1–7) || McAllister (5–8) || Perkins (13) || 13,519 || 61–88
|-  style="text-align:center; background:#bfb;"
| 150 || September 20 || Twins || 4–3 (10) || Rogers (3–3) || Swarzak (3–5) || || 12,331 || 62–88
|-  style="text-align:center; background:#fbb;"
| 151 || September 21 || @ Royals || 6–3 || Mendoza (8–9) || Masterson (11–15) || Holland (15) || 22,805 || 62–89
|-  style="text-align:center; background:#fbb;"
| 152 || September 22 || @ Royals || 5–3 || Smith (6–8) || Jiménez (9–17) || Herrera (2) || 24,304 || 62–90
|-  style="text-align:center; background:#bfb;"
| 153 || September 23 || @ Royals || 15–4 || Huff (2–0) || Odorizzi (0–1) || || 22,960 || 63–90
|-  style="text-align:center; background:#fbb;"
| 154 || September 24 || @ White Sox || 5–4 || Myers (3–7) || Pestano (3–3) || Veal (1) || 20,206 || 63–91
|-  style="text-align:center; background:#bfb;"
| 155 || September 25 || @ White Sox || 4–3 || Kluber (2–4) || Liriano (6–12) || C. Perez (37) || 13,797 || 64–91
|-  style="text-align:center; background:#bfb;"
| 156 || September 26 || @ White Sox || 6–4 || Sipp (1–2) || Thornton (4–9) || C. Perez (38) || 20,166 || 65–91
|-  style="text-align:center; background:#bfb;"
| 157 || September 28 || Royals || 8–5 || Huff (3–0) || Smith (6–9) || C. Perez (39) || 14,850 || 66–91
|-  style="text-align:center; background:#fbb;"
| 158 || September 29 || Royals || 7–6 (14) || Mazzaro (4–3) || Maine (2–3) || Herrera (3) || 17,109 || 66–92
|-  style="text-align:center; background:#bfb;"
| 159 || September 30 || Royals || 15–3 || McAllister (6–8) || Hochevar (8–16) || || 18,099 || 67–92
|-  style="text-align:center; background:#fbb;"
| 160 || October 1 || White Sox || 11–0 || Santiago (4–1) || Kluber (2–5) || || 14,756 || 67–93
|-  style="text-align:center; background:#bfb;"
| 161 || October 2 || White Sox || 4–3 (12) || Seddon (1–1) || Thornton (4–10) || || 10,015 || 68–93
|-  style="text-align:center; background:#fbb;"
| 162 || October 3 || White Sox || 9–0 || Floyd (12–11) || Huff (3–1) || || 18,093 || 68–94
|-

Player stats

Batting
Note: G = Games played; AB = At bats; R = Runs scored; H = Hits; 2B = Doubles; 3B = Triples; HR = Home runs; RBI = Runs batted in; AVG = Batting average; SB = Stolen bases

Pitching
Note: W = Wins; L = Losses; ERA = Earned run average; G = Games pitched; GS = Games started; SV = Saves; IP = Innings pitched; H = Hits allowed; R = Runs allowed; ER = Earned runs allowed; BB = Walks allowed; K = Strikeouts

Roster

Notes/Records
On April 5, the Indians and Toronto Blue Jays set the Major League record for the longest Opening Day game, a 16-inning, 7–4 Indians loss.
On April 16, the Indians set a franchise record by scoring 8+ runs in their first three road games. On April 18, they extended the record to four games.
On May 7, Zach McAllister recorded his first career win and Nick Hagadone recorded his first career save, the first time for Indians pitchers in the same game since 1993.
On May 15, Derek Lowe pitched a complete game shutout without recording a strikeout, the first time an Indians pitcher did so since 1973.
On May 17, Travis Hafner broke a franchise record (Nap Lajoie) with his 80th career hit-by-pitch.
On May 22, Vinnie Pestano broke a franchise record for relievers (Paul Shuey), recording a strikeout in 22 consecutive appearances. On May 23, he extended the record to 23 consecutive appearances.
On May 29, Luke Carlin reached base on errors three times, the first time an Indians player did so in one game since 1973.
On June 15, Michael Brantley extended his hitting streak to 22 games, the longest for the Indians since 2007.
On June 19, trailing 2-1 in the 10th, shortstop Asdrúbal Cabrera hit a walk-off home run off of Cincinnati Reds' closer, Aroldis Chapman to defeat the Reds 3-2.
On July 1, Asdrúbal Cabrera and pitcher Chris Perez were selected for the All-Star team, the second selection for both players.
On August 5, Travis Hafner hit his 200th career home run.

Farm system

LEAGUE CHAMPIONS: Akron

References

External links

2012 Cleveland Indians Season Official Site 
2012 Cleveland Indians season at Baseball Reference

Cleveland Guardians seasons
Cleveland
Cleveland Indians